The men's +90 kg weightlifting competitions at the 1968 Summer Olympics in Mexico City took place on 19 October at the Teatro de los Insurgentes. It was the eleventh appearance of the heavyweight class.

Results

References

Weightlifting at the 1968 Summer Olympics